Paluvai is a census town in Thrissur district in the Indian state of Kerala.

Demographics
 India census, Paluvai had a population of 7206. Males constituted 45% of the population and females 55%. The literacy rate was 84%, higher than the national average of 39.3%: male literacy was 83%, and female literacy was 85%. In Paluvai, 11% of the population is under 6 years of age. The town is under Guruvayur Municipality. Paluvai convent and school is one of the popular spots in Paluvai.

References

Cities and towns in Thrissur district